The Rizal Monument in Calamba is a monument built to commemorate the sesquicentennial (150th) birth anniversary of Dr. José Rizal, the Philippines' unofficial national hero and the greatest son of Calamba. It is a  statue sculpted by Jonas Roces and is located at The Plaza, a  park in front of the Calamba City Hall Complex along Bacnotan Road in the barangay of Real. President Benigno Aquino III led the unveiling of the monument on June 19, 2011. The monument was cited as the tallest Rizal monument in the world before former Laguna Governor Jeorge 'E.R.' Ejercito Estregan inaugurated a 26 feet bronze Rizal Monument sculpted by Toym Imao, son of National Artist for Sculpture Abdulmari Asia Imao in Santa Cruz, Laguna, for the 2014 Palarong Pambansa hosted by the province.

Symbolisms 
The statue depicts Rizal holding a book in his right hand and is made of bronze. It stands  which symbolizes the 22 languages and dialects Rizal mastered during his time such as Spanish, English, German, Japanese, Chinese and others. It is placed on top of a 2.8 meter podium consisting of 15-step stairway which symbolizes one decade since Rizal was born in 1861. It also has a granite pedestal of 7.87 feet and a 13.12 feet circular stairway base. The monument's total height is 43 feet (equivalent to a four-storey building) and its weight is 2 tons.

History 

The City Government of Calamba, through the leadership of then Mayor Joaquin Chipeco started the idea of building the tallest Rizal monument as a gift of the people of Calamba as a tribute to its greatest son. He realized that it is proper and fitting to have the tallest monument in honor of Rizal in his hometown. Together with the local government unit of Calamba, the Philippine Amusement and Gaming Corporation (PAGCOR) initially funded the construction of the Rizal Monument. A young sculptor Jonas F. Roces from Marikina was commissioned to build the Rizal monument in December 2010. The original plan was to build a 16.4 feet monument. However, then Mayor Chipeco learned that the monument being sculpted is behind the current tallest Rizal monument in Nueva Vizcaya built by a Jordanian national. Three months before the official unveiling, the Rizal@150 Executive Committee increased the height of the monument to 22 feet.  It was officially unveiled by President Benigno Aquino III on June 19, 2011, on the sesquicentennial birth anniversary of Rizal. It consists of two markers from the National Historical Commission of the Philippines and from the City Government of Calamba.

Management 
The Rizal Monument and Plaza is managed by the local government unit of Calamba.

See also 
 José Rizal
 Rizal Monument
 First José Rizal Monument (Daet)

References

External links 

Shrine, Calamba
Buildings and structures in Calamba, Laguna
Marked Historical Structures of the Philippines
Tourist attractions in Laguna (province)
Monuments and memorials in the Philippines